The northern sunfish (Lepomis peltastes) is a North American species of freshwater fish in the sunfish family (Centrarchidae) of order Perciformes. Lepomis peltastes was traditionally recognized as a subspecies of longear sunfish (Lepomis megalotis) but is often considered to be a separate species. However, this change remains controversial.

Identification

The northern sunfish (Lepomis peltastes) and the longear sunfish (Lepomis megalotis) contain very few physical variations. Both are generally small, vibrantly scaled fish with bright, elongated opercular flaps which give the fish an appearance of an "ear", which is a key factor in differentiating the two fishes.  The opercular flaps of Lepomis peltastes tend to have an outline of white and red, while Lepomis megalotis outlines are strictly white. Although each species coloration is nearly identical, the patterns which form from these colors are not. The northern sunfish tends to have more of a lateral stripe and speckled turquoise pattern along its sides, while the longear sunfish tends to have spotting on its sides, still in turquoise. Each fish also has "war paint" all the way from the mouth to the edge of the gill flap in the same color as the speckles or spots. Both also contain olive sides and bright orange bellies. These few differences between Lepomis peltastes and Lepomis megalotis leave these fish incredibly hard to distinguish from one another. In all other aspects, these fish look near identical.

The northern sunfish is usually regarded as a subspecies of the longear sunfish due to little and/or improper justification as to why this fish should be elevated as a separate species. The assertion, brought about by Carl Leavitt Hubbs over three decades ago, has yet to be clarified with ichthyologists.

Habitat and range
Northern sunfish, as the name suggests, inhabits the northernmost portions of the United States, such as the Saint Lawrence River and the Great Lakes Region, as well as the Hudson Bay, Mississippi River, and portions of Ontario, Canada. This fish is found in generally small, quiet, temperate streams or rivers with sandy banks or rocky bottoms. It prefers to be near vegetation where they can avoid strong currents.

Diet
Northern sunfish are more omnivorous than other sunfishes, but mostly feed on insects and other invertebrates found in or near the water. They have been known to prey on mites, microcrustaceans, fish eggs, mollusks, filamentous algae, and smaller fish. Lepomis peltastes is well known for feeding at the water's surface more frequently than other sunfish.

Conservation
Lepomis peltastes is listed as threatened (since 1979) by the state of Wisconsin. This is the only state with a formal recognition of this status condition. High water turbidity, agricultural runoff and pollution could be factors in this. Minnesota evaluated the fish's spotty distribution in their streams, and reported that Lepomis peltastes was dependent on incredibly specific water conditions. A push to list the species as special concern has risen from Minnesota's findings.

References

Lepomis
Fish described in 1870
Freshwater fish of North America